La Vernia Independent School District is a public school district based in La Vernia, Texas (USA).

Located in Wilson County, a portion of the district extends into Guadalupe County.

In 2009, the school district was rated "recognized" by the Texas Education Agency.

Schools
La Vernia High School (Grades 9-12)
La Vernia Junior High School (Grades 6-8)
La Vernia Intermediate School (Grades 3-5)
La Vernia Primary School (Grades K-2)
La Vernia Alternative School (All Grades)

References

External links
 

School districts in Wilson County, Texas
School districts in Guadalupe County, Texas